Natural History Museum of Ege University is a university museum in İzmir, Turkey.
The museum was founded in 1973. Between 1973 and 1991 it was an institute of the faculty. After 1991 it became a subunit of the rectorship.

Exhibited items
There are 4000 items in the exhibition. There are 6 halls in  area.

1. Paleontology (1168 items)
2. Rocks and minerals (811 items)
3. Birds (168 items)
4. Entrance (Turkish fauna) (937 items)
5. General zoology (766 items)
6. Osteology and evolution (81 items)

References

Ege University
Buildings and structures in İzmir
1973 establishments in Turkey
Natural history museums in Turkey